Gayle Mahulette (born 17 April 1993) is a Dutch badminton player. Born in Arnhem, the Netherlands, Mahulette is a Moluccan descent. She won the Dutch National Championships in 2014, 2017 and 2018.

Achievements

BWF International Challenge/Series 
Women's singles

Women's doubles

Mixed doubles

  BWF International Challenge tournament
  BWF International Series tournament
  BWF Future Series tournament

References

External links 
 
 
 

1993 births
Living people
Sportspeople from Arnhem
Dutch people of Moluccan descent
Dutch female badminton players
21st-century Dutch women